Odael Marcos (born 9 March 1973) is a Cuban former handball player. He competed in the men's tournament at the 2000 Summer Olympics.

References

External links
 

1973 births
Living people
Cuban male handball players
Olympic handball players of Cuba
Handball players at the 2000 Summer Olympics
Place of birth missing (living people)
Pan American Games gold medalists for Cuba
Medalists at the 1999 Pan American Games
Handball players at the 1999 Pan American Games
Pan American Games medalists in handball